Seamus Joseph Conneely (born 9 July 1988) is an Irish professional footballer who plays as a central midfielder for Accrington Stanley. He has previously played for Galway United, Sheffield United and Alfreton Town. He was born in London, but moved with his parents to Connemara.

Playing career

Galway United
Conneely (known as "Seamie" by Galway United fans) joined the club in 2007 from Mervue United. He completed a successful season in United's U21s before being given his senior competitive début against Shamrock Rovers at Terryland Park, replacing the injured Wesley Charles. This was Tony Cousins's last game in charge of Galway United.

Sheffield United
In January 2011 he signed an 18-month deal with English side Sheffield United. In over a year after signing for the Blades, Conneely did not make a first team appearance, but he was a regular for the reserve team where he was the team captain. On 9 March 2012 Conneely joined Alfreton Town on loan for a month. He made his Alfreton début the following day, coming on as a substitute after only 16 minutes away against Lincoln City at Sincil Bank in a 1–0 victory for Alfreton Town. After returning to Sheffield United, Conneely was released when his contract expired in May 2012.

International honours
Conneely was capped for Ireland at several youth levels from under-17s and made his under-21s début against Switzerland in October 2009. He also represented Ireland in an under-23 team as part of the 2009–11 International Challenge Trophy.

Career statistics

Honours
Sligo Rovers
League of Ireland (1): 2012
FAI Cup (1): 2013
Setanta Sports Cup (1): 2014

References

External links

 Seamus Conneely match lineups at theplayersagent 
 Profile from official Galway United
Republic of Ireland profile at Soccer Scene

1988 births
Living people
Footballers from Lambeth
English footballers
Republic of Ireland association footballers
Republic of Ireland under-21 international footballers
Republic of Ireland under-23 international footballers
Association football defenders
Association football midfielders
Mervue United A.F.C. players
Galway United F.C. (1937–2011) players
Sheffield United F.C. players
Alfreton Town F.C. players
Sligo Rovers F.C. players
Accrington Stanley F.C. players
League of Ireland players
English Football League players
National League (English football) players